Blackpool Council is the local authority of the Borough of Blackpool, Lancashire, England. It is a unitary authority, having the powers of a county council and district council combined.

Political control

Since becoming a unitary authority in 1998 political control of the council has been held by the following parties:

The next election is due in 2023.

Notes

References

Unitary authority councils of England
Local education authorities in England
Local authorities in Lancashire
Leader and cabinet executives
Billing authorities in England
Local government in Blackpool